Ahmad Sara (also Romanized as Aḩmad Sarā and Aḩmadsarā) is a village in Goli Jan Rural District, in the Central District of Tonekabon County, Mazandaran Province, Iran. At the 2006 census, its population was 416, in 118 families.

References 

Populated places in Tonekabon County